Ashley Cooper may refer to:
Ashley Cooper (politician) (1905–1981), member of the Legislative Assembly of Alberta
Frank Bunker Gilbreth Jr. or Ashley Cooper (1911–2001), journalist, author, and newspaper executive
Ashley Cooper (tennis) (1936–2020), Australian tennis player
Ashley Cooper (photographer) (fl. 1980s–2010s), British photographer
Ashley Cooper (racing driver) (1980–2008), Australian V8 Supercar driver
Ashley Cooper (singer) (born 1988), contestant on New Zealand Idol

See also
Ashley-Cooper, a surname
Astley Cooper (disambiguation)